Pressburg Yeshiva of Jerusalem is a leading yeshiva located in the Givat Shaul neighborhood of Jerusalem. It was founded in 1950 by Rabbi Akiva Sofer (known as the Daas Sofer), a great-grandson of Rabbi Moses Sofer (the Chasam Sofer), who established the original Pressburg Yeshiva in the Austro-Hungarian Empire in 1807. As of 2009, the rosh yeshiva is Rabbi Simcha Bunim Sofer. After his death in 2017, his son Rabbi Avraham Shmuel Binyamin Sofer-Schreiber, who also serves as rosh kollel, succeeded him.

The yeshiva building includes a yeshiva ketana, yeshiva gedola, and kollel.

The main beis medrash doubles as a synagogue where some neighborhood residents also pray on Shabbat. The complex also includes a general neighborhood synagogue which functions as Givat Shaul's main nusach Ashkenaz synagogue.

References

Ashkenazi Jewish culture in Jerusalem
Ashkenazi synagogues
Orthodox yeshivas in Jerusalem
Synagogues in Jerusalem
Orthodox synagogues in Israel
Slovak-Jewish culture in Israel